The Battle of Rivers' Bridge (also known as the Action at Rivers' Bridge) was a battle of the American Civil War fought on February 3, 1865.

Order of battle

Confederate
Commander: Major General Lafayette McLaws

 Harrison's Brigade: Colonel George Harrison, Jr.
 1st Georgia Regulars, Colonel Richard Wayne
 5th Georgia Infantry, Colonel Charles Daniel
 5th Georgia Reserves, Major Charles McGregor
 32nd Georgia Infantry, Lieutenant Colonel E. H. Bacon, Jr.
 47th Georgia Infantry
 Kirkland's Brigade: Brigadier General William Whedbee Kirkland
 17th North Carolina Infantry, Captain Stuart L. Johnston
 42nd North Carolina Infantry, Colonel John E. Brown
50th North Carolina Infantry, Colonel George Wortham
66th North Carolina/10th North Carolina Battalion, Colonel John H. Nethercutt
 Logan's Brigade: Brigadier General Thomas M. Logan
 1st South Carolina Cavalry: Lieutenant James A. Ratchford
 2nd South Carolina Cavalry
 3rd South Carolina Cavalry: Colonel Charles J. Colcock
 Earle's (South Carolina) Battery: Captain William Earle
 3rd Arkansas Cavalry: Major William Blackwell

Union
 XVII Corps: Major General Francis Preston Blair, Jr.
 1st Division: Major General Joseph A. Mower
1st Brigade: Brigadier General John W. Fuller
64th Illinois Infantry
18th Missouri Infantry
27th Ohio Infantry
39th Ohio Infantry
2nd Brigade: Brigadier General John W. Sprague
35th New Jersey Infantry
43rd Ohio Infantry
63rd Ohio Infantry
25th Wisconsin Infantry
3rd Brigade: Colonel Charles H. DeGroat
10th Illinois Infantry
25th Indiana Infantry
32nd Wisconsin Infantry
 4th Division: Brevet Major General Giles Alexander Smith
 1st Brigade: Brigadier General Benjamin F. Potts
14/15th Illinois Infantry
53rd Illinois Infantry
23rd Indiana Infantry
53rd Indiana Infantry
32nd Ohio Infantry
Work in progress

Engagement

While Maj. Gen. William T. Sherman's Union armies marched north across South Carolina, about 1,200 Confederates under Maj. Gen. Lafayette McLaws were posted at the crossing on the Salkehatchie River. Union soldiers began to build bridges to bypass McLaws on February 2. The next day two brigades under Maj. Gen. Francis P. Blair waded through the swamp and flanked the Confederates. McLaws withdrew toward Branchville after stalling Sherman's advance for only one day and Sherman's forces continued moving north towards the state capital Columbia.

Mass grave
In 1876 men from nearby communities reburied the Confederate dead from Rivers Bridge in a mass grave about a mile from the battlefield and began a tradition of annually commemorating the battle. The Rivers Bridge Memorial Association eventually obtained the battlefield and in 1945 turned the site over to South Carolina for a state park. The site is commemorated by the Rivers Bridge State Historic Site.

Battlefield condition
Earthworks used by the Confederate defenders are preserved at the historic site. A portion of the bluff overlooking the river (upon which several Confederate earthworks were located) was significantly altered by the operations of a logging railroad that paralleled the Salkehatchie River during the late 19th century.

Notes

References
  National Park Service battle description
 The Battle for the Salkehatchie
 These Honored Dead: The Battle of Rivers Bridge and Civil War Combat Casualties, a National Park Service Teaching with Historic Places (TwHP) lesson plan
 CWSAC Report Update

1865 in the American Civil War
Bamberg County, South Carolina
River's Bridge
Rivers' Bridge
Rivers' Bridge
February 1865 events
Rivers' Bridge